Kali Bahadur Malla is a Nepalese politician, belonging to the Communist Party of Nepal. In the 2008 Constituent Assembly election he was elected from the Jajarkot-1 constituency, winning 19009 votes.

References

Living people
Communist Party of Nepal (Maoist Centre) politicians
Nepalese atheists
People from Jajarkot District
Year of birth missing (living people)
Members of the National Assembly (Nepal)
Nepal Communist Party (NCP) politicians

Members of the 1st Nepalese Constituent Assembly